Luíza Francineide Coutinho Tomé (born May 10, 1961, Amontada, Brazil, then raised in Itapipoca) is a Brazilian actress.  She is best known for acting in Globo telenovelas through the 1990s and early 2000s, including Pedra sobre Pedra, A Indomada and Porto dos Milagres. She has also acted in film and theatre.

Career
Her first television appearance was in the 1978 Rede Globo (Globe Network) telenovela Dancin' Days, in a non-speaking, minor role in episode 154. In a small scene, she appears for a few seconds next to one of the main characters, Raul (Eduardo Tornaghi) at a New Year's Eve party.

Tomé began acting in television in 1984 when she appeared in the Globo telenovela Corpo a Corpo, which she followed with a starring role in the low-budget 1985 musical film Tropclip. Success did not come until 1989 when she played Carol in the telenovela Tieta.

In 1990, she appeared with Carlos Alberto Riccelli and Vera Fischer in the miniseries Riacho Doce. Through the 1990s she appeared in the Global telenovelas Pedra sobre Pedra, Fera Ferida and A Indomada, among others. Tomé also made several appearances on the long-running show Você Decide, where viewers chose the ending.

In 2001, Tomé caught the attention of the media for her portrayal of Rosa Palmeirão in Porto dos Milagres. Her last role for Globo was in their telenovela Começar de Novo as Lúcia Borges.

In 2006 she joined the Rede Record (Record Network), in the productions Cidadão Brasileiro and Luz do Sol, and the series Os Óculos de Pedro Antão. In 2009, she portrayed Samantha in the popular comedy Bela, a Feia (Bela, the Ugly).

In 2010, Luíza returned to the theater with the show Mulheres Alteradas opposite Mel Lisboa, Daniele Valente and André Bankoff. 

In 2012, she appeared in the telenovela Máscaras. In 2013 Luíza interpreted former model Meg Pantaleão in Dona Xepa. In 2014, she participated in the episode "Milagres em Genesaré", of the miniseries Milagres de Jesus.

In 2016, Luíza returned to play a pimp, this time in Escrava Mãe. In the plot she plays Rosalinda Pavão, who owns a brothel that moves Rio de Janeiro in 1808. In 2017, Luíza returns to RecordTV to play Letícia in the telenovela Apocalipse. In the plot she will be the mother of the protagonist, Zoé (Juliana Knust).

In 2018 he returns to Rede Globo, where he returns to play one of his most successful characters, Scarleth Williams Mackenzie Pitiguary, in the novel O Sétimo Guardião.

Personal life 
She was married to businessman Adriano Facchini but they separated in January 2012 after 17 years of marriage. They have three children together: Bruno, Adriana and Luigi.

Filmography

Television

Movies

References

External links

1961 births
Living people
Brazilian television actresses
Brazilian telenovela actresses
Brazilian film actresses
Brazilian stage actresses